Jim Courier and Todd Woodbridge were the defending champions, but Courier did not participate this year.  Woodbridge partnered Mark Woodforde, losing in the quarterfinals.

Leander Paes and Jan Siemerink won the title, defeating Justin Gimelstob and Sébastien Lareau 6–3, 6–4 in the final.

Seeds

Draw

Draw

External links
Draw

Doubles